Albert F. Huntt (c. 1868 – July 14, 1920) was an architect in Richmond, Virginia. Huntt was born in Richmond in approximately 1868 and his great-grandfather, Otis Manson, was an architect who came to Richmond from New England. He studied at Pennsylvania Military Academy in Chester, Pennsylvania and married Georgiana Bartram Hathaway of Chester after graduation.  He died at his home in Richmond on July 14, 1920.

Huntt designed commercial, industrial and residential buildings including for the American Tobacco Company. Bascom Rowlett often worked with him.

Several of his works are listed on the National Register of Historic Places (NRHP).

Selected works
American Cigar Company (1903), 1148 E. Princess Anne Rd., Norfolk, Virginia (Huntt, Albert F. (attributed to)), NRHP-listed
Cary Ellis Stern residence (1907) at 1700 Grove Avenue, Richmond, Virginia
 Fairmount School, 1501 N. 21st St. (addition, 1908–1909), Richmond, NRHP-listed
Lafferty House (1913) on Monument Avenue, Richmond
 Sorg House (1914) on Monument Avenue, Richmond, for the vice president of the Millhiser Bag Company
Atlantic Motor Company (1919), Richmond, auto showroom building, NRHP-listed, the last work by Huntt.
George house at 1831 Monument Avenue, Richmond
 2300 Monument Avenue, Richmond
 2500 Monument Avenue, Richmond
 Kenilworth and Stratford Court apartments on Monument Avenue, Richmond
One or more works in NRHP-listed Fairmount Historic District, roughly bounded by 24th, Y, 20th, T, R, Q & P Sts., Fairfield & Carrington Aves., & Mechanicsville Tpk., Richmond
One or more works in NRHP-listed West Broad Street Industrial and Commercial Historic District, 1800-2100 blocks of Broad & Marshall Sts., bounded by Allison & Allen Sts., Richmond

References

1868 births
1920 deaths
20th-century American architects
People from Richmond, Virginia